Amazonas 3 is a communications satellite based on the SSL 1300 satellite bus and owned by the Hispasat Group of Madrid, Spain. It was launched by an Ariane 5 ECA launch vehicle on 7 February 2013, with a launch mass of 6265 kg. It will provide C-band and Ku-band service in Brazil for a joint venture of Hispasat and the Brazilian telecommunications carrier Oi.

References 

Spacecraft launched in 2013
Communications satellites in geostationary orbit
2013 in Spain
Satellites of Spain
Satellites using the SSL 1300 bus